Seymour Island or Marambio Island, is an island in the chain of 16 major islands around the tip of the Graham Land on the Antarctic Peninsula. Graham Land is the closest part of Antarctica to South America. It lies within the section of the island chain that resides off the west side of the peninsula's northernmost tip. Within that section, it is separated from Snow Hill Island by Picnic Passage, and sits just east of the larger key, James Ross Island, and its smaller, neighboring island, Vega Island.

Seymour Island is sometimes called Marambio Island or Seymour-Marambio Island, taking its resident Argentine base as its namesake (see section, Base Antárctica Marambio, below).

Historic site
A wooden plaque and rock cairn stand at Penguins Bay, on the southern coast of Seymour Island. The plaque was placed on 10 November 1903 by the crew of the Argentinian Corvette Uruguay on a mission to rescue the members of the Swedish expedition led by Otto Nordenskiöld. The inscription on the plaque, placed where the two parties met, reads:
“10.XI.1903 Uruguay (Argentine Navy) in its journey to give assistance to the Swedish Antarctic expedition”.
The cairn was erected in January 1990 by Argentina at the site of the plaque in commemoration of the same event. The site has been designated a Historic Site or Monument (HSM 60), following a proposal by Argentina to the Antarctic Treaty Consultative Meeting.

Base Antárctica Marambio 

Located in the island is the Marambio Base which is the main Argentine base in Antarctica  operating an airfield (ICAO SAWB) for wheeled landing the whole year.  In winter the base has an average of 55 crew members, but in summer the population of the base can grow to 180.

Climate
The average temperatures on Seymour Island, as measured at Base Antárctica Marambio, are  during the summer and  during the winter. However, on 1 July 2021, the World Meteorological Organization invalidated the reading because based on the analysis of the data, the air temperature was recorded in non-standard conditions, leading to bias and errors in the temperature sensor and readings.

Paleontological significance
The rocks making up Seymour Island date mainly from the Late Cretaceous to the Eocene. Successively younger rock formations found on the island are the López de Bertodano Formation (Cretaceous to early Paleocene) Sobral Formation and Cross Valley Formation (Paleocene) and La Meseta Formation (Eocene). Seymour Island has been referred to as the Rosetta Stone of Antarctic palaeontology, due to the unparalleled insight it provides into the geological and palaeontological history of the continent.

In December 1892 when Norwegian Captain, Carl Anton Larsen landed his ship, the Jason, on Seymour Island, he returned with more than maps of the territory, he found fossils of long-extinct species. Larsen's trip aboard the Jason was significantly more successful than his Swedish Antarctic Expedition journey between 1901 and 1904. During that trip, his ship, the Antarctic, was crushed and sunk by icebergs, and he and his crew were forced to weather fourteen months on the neighboring Snow Hill Island, surviving on penguins and seals. Ever since his voyage on the Jason, the island has been the subject of paleontological study.

The Cretaceous-Paleogene boundary (K-Pg) outcrops on Seymour Island in the upper levels of the López de Bertodano Formation. A small (but significant) iridium anomaly occurs at the boundary on Seymour Island, as at lower latitudes, thought to be fallout from the Chicxulub impactor in the Gulf of Mexico. Directly above the boundary a layer of disarticulated fish fossils occurs, victims of a disturbed ecosystem immediately following the impact event. Multiple reports have described evidence for climatic changes in Antarctica prior to the mass extinction, but the extent to which these affected marine biodiversity is debated. Based on extensive marine fossil collections from Seymour Island, recent work has confirmed that a single and severe mass extinction event occurred at this time in Antarctica just as at lower latitudes.

Seymour Island has also been the site of much study of the Eocene period of climatic cooling, a process that culminated in the initiation of Antarctic glaciation. Studies of the fine fraction carbonate from sites in the Southern Ocean suggest that, rather than a monotonic decrease in temperature over the Eocene period, the middle of the epoch was punctuated by a brief duration of warming (Bohaty and Zachos, 2003).

Seymour Island has been a site of study of many fossils from this particular part of the Eocene period, during which there was a more flourishing ecosystem with diverse biota as a result of the warmer climate. A diverse array of fossilized species has been studied on the island, including extinct penguin species (such as Palaeeudyptes klekowskii and Archaeospheniscus wimani), various species in the bivalvia class and various types of flora and fauna, including a frog.

A fossil marsupial of the extinct family Polydolopidae was found on Seymour Island in 1982. This was the first evidence of land mammals having lived in Antarctica. Further fossils have subsequently been found, including members of the marsupial orders Didelphimorphia (opossum) and Microbiotheria, as well as ungulates and a member of the enigmatic extinct order Gondwanatheria, possibly Sudamerica ameghinoi.

IUGS geological heritage site
In respect of the site being the 'most representative high latitude K-Pg boundary location and one of the most significant and best exposed globally' the 'Cretaceous-Paleogene Transition at Seymour (Marambio) Island' was included by the International Union of Geological Sciences (IUGS) in its assemblage of 100 'geological heritage sites' around the world in a listing published in October 2022. The organisation defines an 'IUGS Geological Heritage Site' as 'a key place with geological elements and/or processes of international scientific relevance, used as a reference, and/or with a substantial contribution to the development of geological sciences through history.'

Features
Bertodano Bay
Cross Valley
Fossil Bight
Larga Valley
Penguin Bight

See also
Snow Hill Island Formation
Composite Antarctic Gazetteer
List of Antarctic islands south of 60° S
SCAR
Territorial claims in Antarctica

References

Islands of the James Ross Island group
Argentine Antarctica
British Antarctic Territory
Chilean Antarctic Territory
Cenozoic Antarctica
First 100 IUGS Geological Heritage Sites
Historic Sites and Monuments of Antarctica
Paleontological sites of Antarctica